Auricularia scissa is a species of jelly-fungus belonging to the Auricularia genus. It has been found in Florida and the Dominican Republic.

References 

Auriculariales
Fungi of Florida
Fungi of the Caribbean
Fungi without expected TNC conservation status